Upper Bann (Ulster Scots: Ower Bann) is a constituency in the Northern Ireland Assembly.

The seat was first used for a Northern Ireland-only election for the Northern Ireland Forum in 1996. Since 1998, it has elected members to the current Assembly.

For Assembly elections prior to 1996, the constituency was largely part of the Armagh and South Down constituencies with a small section around Aghagallon joining from South Antrim.  Since 1997, it has shared boundaries with the Upper Bann UK Parliament constituency.

For further details of the history and boundaries of the constituency, see Upper Bann (UK Parliament constituency).

Members

Note: The columns in this table are used only for presentational purposes, and no significance should be attached to the order of columns. For details of the order in which seats were won at each election, see the detailed results of that election.

Elections

Northern Ireland Assembly

2022

2017

2016

2011

2007

2003

1998

1996 forum
Successful candidates are shown in bold.

References

Constituencies of the Northern Ireland Assembly
Politics of County Down
Politics of County Armagh
1996 establishments in Northern Ireland
Constituencies established in 1996